Athletes from West Germany (Federal Republic of Germany) competed at the 1968 Summer Olympics in Mexico City, Mexico. It was the first time that East Germany (German Democratic Republic) and West Germany sent separate teams to the Summer Olympic Games. 275 competitors, 232 men and 43 women, took part in 154 events in 17 sports for West Germany. As the country hosted the next Olympics in Munich, the West German flag was raised at the closing ceremony.

Medalists

Gold
 Ingrid Becker — Athletics, Women's Pentathlon
 Roswitha Esser, Annemarie Zimmermann — Canoeing, K2 500m Kayak Pairs
 Josef Neckermann, Reiner Klimke, Liselott Linsenhoff — Equestrian, Dressage Team
 Horst Meyer, Wolfgang Hottenrott, Dirk Schreyer, Egbert Hirschfelder, Rüdiger Henning, Jörg Siebert, Lutz Ulbricht, Niko Ott, Gunther Tiersch — Rowing, Men's Eight
 Bernd Klingner — Shooting, 50m Rifle Three Positions

Silver
 Gerhard Hennige — Athletics, Men's 400m Hurdles
 Claus Schiprowski — Athletics, Men's Pole Vault
 Hans-Joachim Walde — Athletics, Men's Decathlon
 Liesel Westermann — Athletics, Women's Discus Throw
 Detlef Lewe — Canoeing, Men's C1 1.000m Canoe Singles
 Renate Breuer — Canoeing, Women's K1 500m Kayak Singles
 Karl Link, Udo Hempel, Karlheinz Henrichs, Jürgen Kissner — Cycling, Men's Team Pursuit
 Josef Neckermann — Equestrian, Dressage Individual
 Jochen Meißner — Rowing, Men's Single Sculls
 Ulli Libor, Peter Naumann — Sailing, Flying Dutchman
 Heinz Mertel — Shooting, 50m Pistol

Bronze
 Bodo Tümmler — Athletics, Men's 1.500 metres
 Helmar Müller, Manfred Kinder, Gerhard Hennige, Martin Jellinghaus — Athletics, Men's 4 × 400 m Relay
 Kurt Bendlin — Athletics, Men's Decathlon
 Günther Meier — Boxing, Men's Light Middleweight
 Reiner Klimke — Equestrian, Dressage Individual
 Hermann Schridde, Alwin Schockemöhle, Hans Günter Winkler — Equestrian, Jumping Team
 Konrad Wirnhier — Shooting, Skeet
 Michael Holthaus — Swimming, Men's 400m Individual Medley
 Angelika Kraus, Uta Frommater, Heike Hustede, Heidemarie Reineck — Swimming, Women's 4 × 100 m Medley Relay
 Wilfried Dietrich — Wrestling, Men's Freestyle Heavyweight

Athletics

Boxing

Canoeing

Cycling

Fourteen cyclists represented West Germany in 1968.

Individual road race
 Burkhard Ebert
 Jürgen Tschan
 Ortwin Czarnowski
 Dieter Koslar

Team time trial
 Burkhard Ebert
 Jürgen Tschan
 Ortwin Czarnowski
 Dieter Koslar

Sprint
 Jürgen Barth

1000m time trial
 Herbert Honz

Tandem
 Klaus Kobusch
 Martin Stenzel

Individual pursuit
 Rupert Kratzer

Team pursuit
 Udo Hempel
 Karl Link
 Karl Heinz Henrichs
 Jürgen Kissner
 Rainer Podlesch

Diving

Equestrian

Fencing

20 fencers, 15 men and 5 women, represented West Germany in 1968.

Men's foil
 Tim Gerresheim
 Friedrich Wessel
 Dieter Wellmann

Men's team foil
 Jürgen Theuerkauff, Friedrich Wessel, Tim Gerresheim, Jürgen Brecht, Dieter Wellmann

Men's épée
 Fritz Zimmermann
 Franz Rompza
 Dieter Jung

Men's team épée
 Dieter Jung, Franz Rompza, Fritz Zimmermann, Max Geuter, Paul Gnaier

Men's sabre
 Paul Wischeidt
 Walter Köstner
 Volker Duschner

Men's team sabre
 Percy Borucki, Walter Köstner, Paul Wischeidt, Klaus Allisat, Volker Duschner

Women's foil
 Heidi Schmid
 Helga Mees
 Monika Pulch

Women's team foil
 Heidi Schmid, Helga Koch, Gundi Theuerkauff, Monika Pulch, Helga Mees

Field hockey

Eighteen male field hockey players competed in 1968, when the West German team finished in 4th place.

 Wolfgang Rott
 Günther Krauss
 Utz Aichinger
 Jürgen Wein
 Klaus Greinert
 Uli Vos
 Detlev Kittstein
 Norbert Schuler
 Fritz Schmidt
 Carsten Keller
 Michael Krause
 Wolfgang Müller
 Dirk Michel
 Eckardt Suhl
 Ulrich Sloma
 Hermann End
 Friedrich Josten
 Wolfgang Baumgart

Gymnastics

Modern pentathlon

Three male pentathletes represented West Germany in 1968.

Individual
 Elmar Frings
 Heiner Thade
 Hans Jürgen Todt

Team
 Elmar Frings
 Heiner Thade
 Hans Jürgen Todt

Rowing

West Germany had 26 male rowers participate in all seven rowing events in 1968.

 Men's single sculls – 2nd place ( silver medal)
 Jochen Meißner

 Men's double sculls
 Wolfgang Glock
 Udo Hild

 Men's coxless pair
 Günther Karl
 Franz Held

 Men's coxed pair
 Bernhard Hiesinger
 Rolf Hartung
 Lutz Benter (cox)

 Men's coxless four
 Thomas Hitzbleck
 Manfred Weinreich
 Volkhart Buchter
 Jochen Heck

 Men's coxed four
 Niko Ott
 Peter Berger
 Udo Brecht
 Hans-Johann Färber
 Stefan Armbruster (cox)

 Men's eight – 1st place ( gold medal)
 Horst Meyer
 Dirk Schreyer
 Rüdiger Henning
 Wolfgang Hottenrott
 Lutz Ulbricht
 Egbert Hirschfelder
 Jörg Siebert
 Niko Ott
 Gunther Tiersch (cox)
 Roland Böse (heat 1)

Sailing

Shooting

Twelve shooters, all men, represented West Germany in 1968. Bernd Klingner won gold in the 50 m rifle, three positions and Konrad Wirnhier won bronze in the skeet.

25 m pistol
 Erich Masurat
 Hans Standl

50 m pistol
 Heinz Mertel
 Kurt Meyer

50 m rifle, three positions
 Bernd Klingner
 Peter Kohnke

50 m rifle, prone
 Karl Wenk
 Klaus Zähringer

Trap
 Werner Bühse
 Erich Gehmann

Skeet
 Konrad Wirnhier
 Karl Meyer zu Hölsen

Swimming

Water polo

Men's Team Competition
 Preliminary Round (Group A)
 Defeated Spain (5:3)
 Lost to Hungary (4:6)
 Lost to Soviet Union (3:6)
 Defeated Brazil (10:5)
 Lost to Cuba (6:7)
 Lost to United States (5:7)
 Classification Matches
9th/12th place: Defeated Mexico (6:3)
9th/10th place: Lost to Spain (5:7) → Tenth place

 Team Roster
Dietmar Seiz
Günter Kilian
Heinz Kleimeier
Hermann Haverkamp
Kurt Schuhmann
Ludger Weeke
Ludwig Ott
Peter Teicher
Wolf-Rüdiger Schulz
Johannes Hoffmeister
Lajos Nagy

Weightlifting

Wrestling

References

External links
 Official Olympic Reports
 International Olympic Committee results database

Germany, West
1968
Summer Olympics